Manuel Gutiérrez (born 10 December 1964) is a Panamanian swimmer. He competed at the 1984 Summer Olympics and the 1988 Summer Olympics.

References

External links
 

1964 births
Living people
Panamanian male swimmers
Olympic swimmers of Panama
Swimmers at the 1984 Summer Olympics
Swimmers at the 1988 Summer Olympics
Pan American Games competitors for Panama
Swimmers at the 1987 Pan American Games
Place of birth missing (living people)
20th-century Panamanian people
21st-century Panamanian people